Allotment may refer to:

 Allotment (Dawes Act), an area of land held by the US Government for the benefit of an individual Native American, under the Dawes Act of 1887
 Allotment (finance), a method by which a company allocates over-subscribed shares
 Allotment (gardening), an area of land rented out for non-commercial gardening or farming
 Allotment (travel industry), a block of pre-negotiated carrier seats or hotel rooms held by a travel organizer
 Allotment of the Promised Land by Joshua; see Book of Joshua#Division of the land (chapters 13–22)
 Sortition or allotment, a method of selection by lottery
 The Allotment, a 1988 book by Colin Ward

See also
 Allod, a type of property holding in the Middle Ages and early Modern Period